= Edward Selmar Siebert =

American painter

- Born: July 1, 1857; Washington, D.C., U.S.
- Died: January 31, 1944 (aged 86); Rochester, New York, U.S.
- Occupations: Painter, etcher

Edward Selmar Siebert (July 1, 1857 – January 31, 1944) was an American painter and etcher. Born in Washington, D.C. and trained in Germany, he opened his studio in Rochester, New York, where he did portrait and landscape paintings as well as still lifes. His work is in the collection of the Smithsonian American Art Museum.

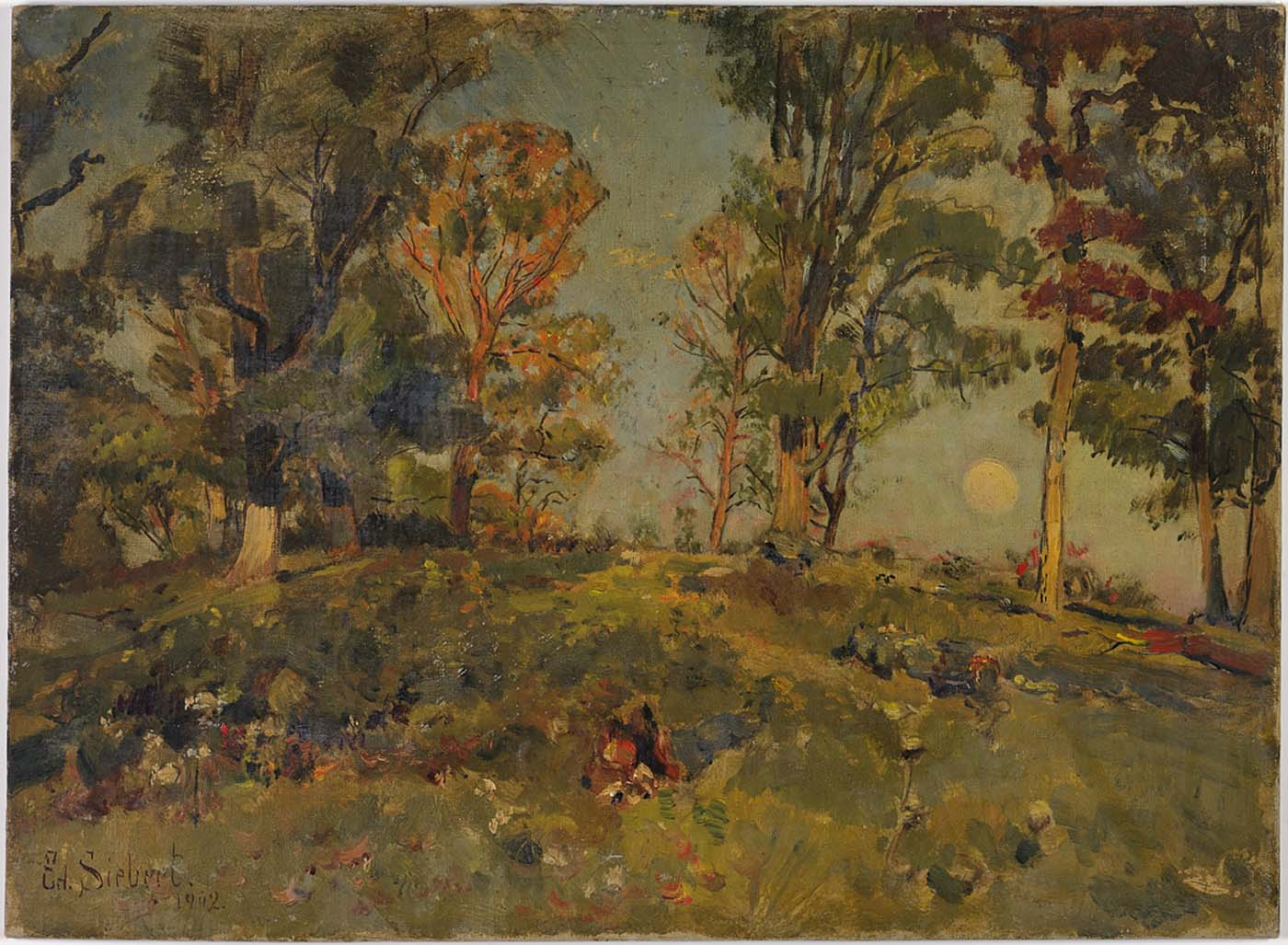
Willside Landscape.
